Grindstone Creek is a stream in the U.S. state of South Dakota.

Grindstone Creek was named after nearby Grindstone Butte.

See also
List of rivers of South Dakota

References

Rivers of Haakon County, South Dakota
Rivers of South Dakota